Alessandro Zan (born 4 October 1973 in Padova) is an Italian left-wing politician, LGBT activist.

Biography 
Zan is a leading member of the Italian gay organisation Arcigay. Since 2013 he has been a member of Italian Chamber of Deputies.

Born in Padua in 1973, Alessandro Zan is a member of the Italian Parliament, and an LGBTQIA+ activist. He graduated in telecommunications engineering at University of Padua, and Alessandro Zan’s activism began during his studies, with his involvement in peace movements and student associations. In 2001 he became the president of the local Arcigay section (the most important LGBTQIA+ Italian association) and in 2002 he organized the National Gay Pride in his own city, Padua. 

In 2004 Alessandro Zan was elected for the first time to city council of Padua, which in 2006, thanks to his commitment, became the first Italian city to adopt a register for homosexual couples and families. Elected for the second time to city council in 2009, he assumed the office of City Councilor for environment, labour and international cooperation. In 2008 he founded the Padova Pride Village, which is now the most important LGBTQIA+ event in Italy. 

Since 2013, the year in which he was elected to the House of Representatives, he has been fighting for the absolute equality of the Italian LGBTQIA+ community’s rights: in fact in 2016 he personally witnessed the passing of the law on civil partnerships – the first standard in Italy which, in the eyes of the State, recognized LGBTQIA+ couples and families – and delivered the speech marking its final adoption in Parliament. The latest bill on the matter of same sex marriage is called the “Zan bill”, because he was the first signer and the rapporteur in the House of Rapresentatives.

References
«Padova ancora una volta apripista dei diritti»  Mattino Padova 2 January 2013
 Alessandro Zan: "Meglio investire in caldaie ecologiche che bloccare il traffico" 22 August 2009
Auto blu? Per l'assessore lo scooter verde Alessandro Zan, responsabile dell'Ambiente del Comune, dà il buon esempio: per lui le due ruote ecologiche della Oxygen al posto della vettura istituzionale Corriere del Veneto 14 April 2010

Living people
Gay politicians
Left Ecology Freedom politicians
Democratic Party (Italy) politicians
21st-century Italian politicians
Members of the Chamber of Deputies (Italy)
1973 births
Italian LGBT rights activists
University of Padua alumni
21st-century Italian LGBT people